Siddhartha is an opera-ballet by Per Nørgård to a libretto by Ole Sarvig. Written 1974-79 it was premiered at the Royal Opera in Stockholm in 1983.

Recording
Edith Guillaume, Stig Fogh Andersen, Tina Kiberg, Aage Haugland, Erik Harbo, Kim Janken, Poul Elming, Christian Christiansen, Minna Nyhus, Birgitte Frieboe, Anne Frellesvig, Gert Mortensen, DR KoncertKoret, DR SymfoniOrkestret, Jan Latham-Koenig Dacapo

References

Operas
1983 operas
Operas by Per Nørgård
Danish-language operas